Karachchi Divisional Secretariat is a  Divisional Secretariat  of Kilinochchi District, of Northern Province, Sri Lanka. It has a population of 61,484 (2012).

References

 Divisional Secretariats Portal

Divisional Secretariats of Kilinochchi District